Robert Reid (19 February 1911 – 16 November 1987) was a Scottish footballer who played at both professional and international levels as an outside left. His best remembered for his time in the Football League with Brentford, for whom he made 110 appearances. Reid earned the nickname 'The Flying Scotsman' for his performances down the wing for Hamilton Academical early in his career.

Club career
Reid began his career in his native Scotland with Hamilton Academical and played for the club in the 1935 Scottish Cup Final. He moved to England in January 1936 to reunite with friend David McCulloch at First Division club Brentford. A spell out following an appendicitis operation in 1936 allowed Les Smith into the team, with whom Reid would battle for a place through the rest of his Bees career. During his three years at Griffin Park, he was among the club's leading scorers, behind David McCulloch.

Reid joined Sheffield United for a £6,000 fee in February 1939 and with his time at the club being affected by the Second World War, he made just 14 league appearances, scoring four goals, before his departure after the war in November 1946. Reid next spent a season with Bury, scoring 1 goal in 17 league appearances, before ending his career with a player-coach spell at Third Lanark.

International and representative career
Reid won two caps for Scotland during the 1937–38 season. He also made two appearances for the Scottish League XI.

Post-playing career 
Reid served Bury, Third Lanark, Airdrieonians and former club Hamilton Academical as a physiotherapist, arriving back at Douglas Park in the late 1960s. By the time of his death in November 1987, Reid was still with the Accies, working also as kit man.

Career statistics

Honours 
Hamilton Academical
 Lanarkshire Cup (1): 1933–34, 1938–39
 Southern Counties Cup (2): 1933–34, 1934–35

Individual

 PFA Scotland Merit Award

References

External links 

 

1911 births
1987 deaths
Scottish footballers
Scotland international footballers
Hamilton Academical F.C. players
Brentford F.C. players
Sheffield United F.C. players
Bury F.C. players
Scottish Football League players
English Football League players
Association football outside forwards
Scottish Football League representative players
Hamilton Academical F.C. non-playing staff
Bury F.C. non-playing staff
Airdrieonians F.C. (1878) non-playing staff
Third Lanark A.C. non-playing staff
Third Lanark A.C. players
Footballers from Hamilton, South Lanarkshire
Stranraer F.C. players
Hamilton Academical F.C. wartime guest players
Ayr United F.C. non-playing staff